The 2022 Challenger Concepción was a professional tennis tournament played on clay courts. It was the second edition of the tournament which was part of the 2022 ATP Challenger Tour. It took place in Concepción, Chile between 17 and 23 January 2022.

Singles main-draw entrants

Seeds

1 Rankings as of 10 January 2022.

Other entrants
The following players received wildcards into the singles main draw:
  Francisco Cerúndolo
  Hugo Dellien
  Benjamín Torres

The following players received entry into the singles main draw as alternates:
  Gonzalo Achondo
  Román Andrés Burruchaga
  Matías Franco Descotte
  Quentin Folliot
  Diego Hidalgo
  Strong Kirchheimer
  Wilson Leite
  Cristian Rodríguez
  Michel Vernier

The following players received entry from the qualifying draw:
  Ignacio Becerra
  Cristóbal Castro
  Felipe Hernández
  Alexander Merino
  Víctor Núñez
  Miguel Ángel Reyes-Varela

Champions

Singles

 Daniel Elahi Galán def.  Santiago Rodríguez Taverna 6–1, 3–6, 6–3.

Doubles

 Diego Hidalgo /  Cristian Rodríguez def.  Francisco Cerúndolo /  Camilo Ugo Carabelli 6–2, 6–0.

References

2022 ATP Challenger Tour
2022 in Chilean sport
January 2022 sports events in Chile